Elden Mills (June 24, 1908 – May 9, 1965) was an American politician who served in the New Jersey General Assembly from the Morris district from 1948 to 1958. He served as Speaker of the New Jersey General Assembly in 1957.

References

1908 births
1965 deaths
Speakers of the New Jersey General Assembly
Republican Party members of the New Jersey General Assembly
People from Morristown, New Jersey
20th-century American politicians